A Bitter Fate, also translated as A Bitter Lot, is an 1859 realistic play by Aleksey Pisemsky. 

Started in early 1859 in St. Petersburg, finished on 19 August and first published by Biblioteka Dlya Chteniya in November that year, the four-act play tackles serfdom in Russia and the social and moral divisions that it creates by means of a story that focuses on a provincial ménage à trois. With the exception of Leo Tolstoy's The Power of Darkness (1886), it is the only major play to dramatise the experiences of peasants in the history of Russian realistic drama. It has been described as a masterpiece of the Russian theatre and the first Russian realistic tragedy. The play is available in English translation in Masterpieces of the Russian Drama, Volume 1, edited by George Rapall Noyes, Dover Publications, 1961.

References

Sources

 Banham, Martin, ed. 1998. The Cambridge Guide to Theatre. Cambridge: Cambridge UP. .
 Eriksen, Gordon, Garrard MacLeod, and Martin Wisneski, ed. 1960. Encyclopædia Britannica 15th Edition. Volume 9. 
 Moser, Charles A., ed. 1992. The Cambridge History of Russian Literature. Rev. ed. Cambridge: Cambridge UP. .

Works by Aleksey Pisemsky
1859 plays
Russian plays
Plays set in Russia